Baytsury is a rural locality (a selo) in Borisovsky District, Belgorod Oblast, Russia. The population was 363 as of 2010. There are 6 streets.

Geography 
Baytsury is located 18 km southeast of Borisovka (the district's administrative centre) by road. Novoalexandrovka is the nearest rural locality.

References 

Rural localities in Borisovsky District